James Macpherson (Gaelic: Seumas MacMhuirich or Seumas Mac a' Phearsain; 27 October 1736 – 17 February 1796) was a Scottish writer, poet, literary collector, and politician. He is known for the Ossian cycle of epic poems, which he claimed to have discovered and translated from Gaelic.

Early life and education
Macpherson was born at Ruthven in the parish of Kingussie in Badenoch, Inverness-shire. This was a Scottish Gaelic-speaking area but near the Ruthven Barracks of the British Army, established in 1719 to enforce Whig rule from London after the Jacobite uprising of 1715. Macpherson's uncle, Ewen Macpherson joined the Jacobite army in the 1745 march south, when Macpherson was nine years old and after the Battle of Culloden, had had to remain in hiding for nine years.  In the 1752-3 session, Macpherson was sent to King's College, Aberdeen, moving two years later to Marischal College (the two institutions later became the University of Aberdeen), reading Caesar's Commentaries on the relationships between the 'primitive' Germanic tribes and the 'enlightened' Roman imperial army; it is also believed that he attended classes at the University of Edinburgh as a divinity student in 1755–56. During his years as a student, he ostensibly wrote over 4,000 lines of verse, some of which was later published, notably The Highlander (1758), a six-canto epic poem, which he attempted to suppress sometime after its publication.

Collecting Scottish Gaelic poetry
On leaving college, he returned to Ruthven to teach in the school there, and then became a private tutor. At Moffat he met John Home, the author of Douglas, for whom he recited some Gaelic verses from memory. He also showed him manuscripts of Gaelic poetry, supposed to have been picked up in the Scottish Highlands and the Western Isles; one was called The Death of Oscar.

In 1760, Macpherson visited North Uist and met with John MacCodrum, the official Bard to the Chief of Clan MacDonald of Sleat. As a result of their encounter, MacCodrum made, according to John Lorne Campbell, "a brief appearance in the Ossianic controversy which is not without its humorous side." When Macpherson met MacCodrum, he asked, "A bheil dad agaibh air an Fheinne?" Macpherson believed himself to have asked, "Do you know anything of the Fianna?" He had actually said, however, "Do the Fianna owe you anything?"

In reply, MacCodrum quipped, "Cha n-eil agus ge do bhiodh cha ruiginn a leas iarraidh a nis", or in English, "No, and if they did it would be useless to ask for it now." According to Campbell, this, "dialogue... illustrates at once Macpherson's imperfect Gaelic and MacCodrum's quickness of reply."

Encouraged by Home and others, Macpherson produced 15 pieces, all laments for fallen warriors, translated from the Scottish Gaelic, despite his limitations in that tongue, which he was induced to publish at Edinburgh in 1760, including the Death of Oscar, in a pamphlet: Fragments of Ancient Poetry collected in the Highlands of Scotland. Extracts were then published in The Scots Magazine and The Gentleman's Magazine which were popular and the notion of these fragments as glimpses of an unrecorded Gaelic epic began.

Hugh Blair, who was a firm believer in the authenticity of the poems, raised a subscription to allow Macpherson to pursue his Gaelic researches. In the autumn,1760,  Macpherson set out to visit western Inverness-shire, the islands of Skye, North Uist, South Uist and Benbecula. Allegedly, Macpherson obtained manuscripts which he translated with the assistance of a Captain Morrison and the Rev. Gallie. Later he made an expedition to the Isle of Mull, where he claimed to obtain other manuscripts.

Ossian
In 1761, Macpherson announced the discovery of an epic on the subject of Fingal supposedly written by Ossian, which he published in December. Like the 1760 Fragments of Ancient Poetry, it was written in musical measured prose. The full title of the work was Fingal, an Ancient Epic Poem in Six Books, together with Several Other Poems composed by Ossian, the Son of Fingal, translated from the Gaelic Language. The narrative was related to the Irish mythological character Fionn mac Cumhaill/Finn McCool. The figure of Ossian was based on Fionn's son Oisín. Fingal takes his name from Fionnghall, meaning "white stranger". Another related poem, Temora, followed in 1763, and a collected edition, The Works of Ossian, in 1765. 

The authenticity of these so-called translations from the works of a 3rd-century bard was immediately challenged by Irish historians, especially Charles O'Conor, who noted technical errors in chronology and in the forming of Gaelic names, and commented on the implausibility of many of Macpherson's claims, none of which Macpherson was able to substantiate. More forceful denunciations were later made by Samuel Johnson, who asserted (in A Journey to the Western Islands of Scotland, 1775) that Macpherson had found fragments of poems and stories, and then woven them into a romance of his own composition. Further challenges and defences were made well into the nineteenth century, but the issue was moot by then. Macpherson's manuscript Gaelic "originals" were published posthumously in 1807; Ludwig Christian Stern was sure they were in fact back-translations from his English version.

Later works
In 1764 Macpherson was made secretary to the colonial governor George Johnstone at Pensacola, Florida. He returned to Great Britain two years later, and, despite a quarrel with Johnstone, was allowed to retain his salary as a pension.

Macpherson went on to write several historical works, the most important of which was Original Papers, containing the Secret History of Great Britain from the Restoration to the Accession of the House of Hanover, to which are prefixed Extracts from the Life of James II, as written by himself (1775). He enjoyed a salary for defending the policy of Lord North's government, and held the lucrative post of London agent to the Nawab of Arcot. He entered parliament in 1780, as Member of Parliament for Camelford and continued to sit for the remainder of his life.

Time in Parliament
Despite his Jacobite roots, and in line with his Hanovarian sympathies, for a time Macpherson had desired a seat in Parliament and he finally received it in the 1780 general election. On 11 September 1780, he became junior member for Camelford. Later he became the senior member in the results of the April 1784 election. He stayed in this position until his death. Although there is not a lot recorded about his time in parliament, his name is in a list of confidential parliamentary pensions which suggest that his undocumented work was more of an under-the-table government scheme.  This suggestion is more or less backed by letters corresponding with other suggested government scammers of the time such as Paul Benfield. In 1783 he also held a position as an agent working with Sir Nathaniel Wraxall,  and was noted since this time for being very wealthy, probably from his secret parliamentary pensions he was receiving.

Death
In his later years he bought an estate, to which he gave the name Belville or Balavil, in his native Inverness-shire, where he died at the age of 59. Macpherson's remains were carried from Scotland and interred in Westminster Abbey. The Crofters Party MP and antiquarian Charles Fraser-Mackintosh commented on the success of James Macpherson in his second series of Antiquarian Notes (Inverness 1897, pp 369 et seq, public domain), accusing the famous poet of being a perpetrator of the Highland Clearances:Mr James Macpherson of Ossianic fame, who acquired Phoiness, Etterish, and Invernahaven, began this wretched business and did it so thoroughly that not much remained for his successors ... Every place James Macpherson acquired was cleared, and he also had a craze for changing and obliterating the old names ... [including] ... Raitts into Belville. Upon this point it may be noticed that Mac Ossian, in making an entail and calling four of his numerous bastards in the first instance to the succession, declares an irritancy if any of the heirs uses any other designation than that of Macpherson of Belville.Fraser-Mackintosh then asserts that Macpherson bought the right to be buried in Westminster Abbey. A recent commentator suggests Macpherson has become known as "a descendant of a Jacobite clan who became a sycophantic Hanovarian toady, a man for the main chance".

Legacy
After Macpherson's death, Malcolm Laing, in an appendix to his History of Scotland (1800), concluded that the so-called Ossianic poems were altogether modern in origin, and that Macpherson's authorities were practically non-existent.

Despite the above, some critics claim that Macpherson nonetheless produced a work of art which by its deep appreciation of natural beauty and the melancholy tenderness of its treatment of the ancient legend did more than any single work to bring about the romantic movement in European, and especially in German, literature. It was quickly translated into many European languages, and Herder and Goethe (in his earlier period) were among its profound admirers. Goethe incorporated his translation of a part of the work into his novel The Sorrows of Young Werther. Melchiore Cesarotti's Italian translation was reputedly a favourite of Napoleon.

Macpherson's legacy indirectly includes the naming of Fingal's Cave on the island of Staffa. The original Gaelic name is "An Uamh Bhin" ("the melodious cave"), but it was renamed by Sir Joseph Banks in 1772 at the height of Macpherson's popularity.

See also
Iolo Morganwg

References

Sources

Further reading

External links 

James Macpherson at the Eighteenth-Century Poetry Archive (ECPA)
Digitised version of Fingal, an ancient epic poem. : In six books: together with several other poems, composed by Ossian the son of Fingal. / Translated from the Galic language, by James Macpherson.., 1762 edition at National Library of Scotland
Literary Encyclopedia: Ossian
Significant Scots
Popular Tales of the West Highlands by J. F. Campbell Volume IV (1890)
The Poetical Works of Ossian at the Ex-Classics Web Site
 
 
 

1736 births
1796 deaths
18th-century Scottish writers
18th-century Scottish poets
Alumni of the University of Aberdeen
Alumni of the University of Edinburgh
British MPs 1780–1784
British MPs 1784–1790
British MPs 1790–1796
James
Epic poetry collectors
Literary forgeries
Members of the Parliament of Great Britain for Camelford
Mythopoeic writers
People from Aberdeen
People from Inverness
People from Kingussie
People of the Scottish Enlightenment
Romantic poets
Scottish folk-song collectors
Scottish folklorists
Scottish politicians
Scottish translators
Translators from Scottish Gaelic
Translators to English